Ivan Smilenov (born 4 April 1966) is a Bulgarian cross-country skier. He competed at the 1988 Winter Olympics and the 1992 Winter Olympics.

References

External links
 

1966 births
Living people
Bulgarian male cross-country skiers
Olympic cross-country skiers of Bulgaria
Cross-country skiers at the 1988 Winter Olympics
Cross-country skiers at the 1992 Winter Olympics
Place of birth missing (living people)